The National Day of Sweden is a national holiday observed annually in Sweden on 6 June. Prior to 1983, the day was celebrated as the Swedish Flag Day. At that time, the day was named the Swedish National Day by the parliament of Sweden.

History 

The tradition of celebrating this date began in  1916 at the Stockholm Olympic Stadium, in honor of the election of King Gustav Vasa on 6 June 1523, as this was considered the foundation of modern Sweden. Some question the validity of this as a national holiday, as it was not observed as a holiday until decades later. However, the event signifies the end of the Danish-ruled Kalmar Union, so in a sense it is a marking of Swedish independence, though the event occurred so long ago that it has not as strong a presence in the social consciousness as does, for example, the Norwegian Constitution Day, Syttende mai. Although the national day is celebrated on 6 June, it is actually wrong due to the Julian calendar which was in use before 1582, when the Gregorian calendar was introduced, and which (before March 1700) was ten days behind the Gregorian calendar; the anniversary of the election of King Gustav Vasa should therefore be celebrated on 16 June rather than 6 June.

In 2005, it became an official Swedish public holiday, replacing Whit Monday. This change led to fewer days off from work (more working-days) as 6 June will periodically fall on the weekend, unlike Whit Monday, which was always celebrated on a Monday. Among newer traditions that have emerged since National Day turned red day is an invitation from the King to the public to visit large parts of Stockholm Palace all day  without the usual entry fees.

Image gallery

See also 
 "Du gamla, du fria" –  national anthem of Sweden
 Flag flying days in Sweden – days of the calendar year designated as official Swedish Flag Flying Days
 Mother Svea – patriotic emblem of the Swedish nation
 Three Crowns – national emblem of Sweden

References 

Swedish culture
Society of Sweden
Sweden
Sweden
Swedish flag flying days
June observances
Public holidays in Sweden
Summer events in Sweden